Gen. Yu Hanmou (1896–1981) was a KMT general from Guangdong. He was the Commander-in-Chief of the 12th Army Group from 1938–44. He commanded the defense of Guangdong in the Canton Operation and 1939-40 Winter Offensive. Later in 1944 until the end of the war, he commanded the 7th War Area, fighting in the Battle of Henan-Hunan-Guangxi.

References

Sources
Yu Hanmou

1896 births
1981 deaths
National Revolutionary Army generals from Guangdong
Politicians from Zhaoqing
Republic of China politicians from Guangdong
Politicians of Taiwan
Taiwanese people from Guangdong